Screen on the Green may refer to

Screen on the Green (Atlanta), an outdoor summer movie festival in Atlanta, Georgia
Screen on the Green (Washington, DC), an outdoor summer movie festival in Washington, DC
The Screen On The Green, an English cinema in Islington